Tropic of Scorpio is the debut studio album of American post-hardcore/indie rock band Girls Against Boys, released on December 2, 1992 by record label Adult Swim.

Reception 

AllMusic called it "a slightly off-and-on affair, but when it works it fulfills the promise of the earliest recordings and then a little bit more."

Track listing

Personnel 
Adapted from the Tropic of Scorpio liner notes.

 Girls Against Boys
 Alexis Fleisig – drums
 Eli Janney – sampler, production, engineering
 Scott McCloud – lead vocals, guitar
 Johnny Temple – bass guitar

Production and additional personnel
 Nathan Larson – trumpet, backing vocals
 Yuri Martyr – photography
 David Rathbone – charango
 Chris Thomson – backing vocals
 Zeke Weiner – tabla
 Luke Wood – guitar

Release history

References

External links 
 

1992 debut albums
Girls Against Boys albums